The Civil War is a 1990 American television documentary miniseries created by Ken Burns about the American Civil War. It was the first broadcast to air on PBS for five consecutive nights, from September 23 to 27, 1990.

More than 39 million viewers tuned in to at least one episode, and viewership averaged more than 14 million viewers each evening, making it the most-watched program ever to air on PBS. It was awarded more than 40 major television and film honors. A companion book to the documentary was released shortly after the series aired.

Its filmography was groundbreaking for the time, and spawned film techniques such as the Ken Burns effect. Its theme song, "Ashokan Farewell" is widely acclaimed. The series was extremely influential, and serves as the main source of knowledge about the Civil War to many Americans. However, some historians have criticized its historical accuracy, especially its lack of coverage of slavery as a cause of the war.

The series was rebroadcast in June 1994 as a lead-up to Baseball, then remastered for its 12th anniversary in 2002, although it remained in standard definition resolution. To commemorate the film's 25th anniversary and the 150th anniversary of Lincoln's assassination, the film underwent a complete digital restoration to high-definition format in 2015.

Production
Mathew Brady's photographs inspired Burns to make The Civil War, which (in nine episodes totaling more than 10 hours) explores the war's military, social, and political facets through some 16,000 contemporary photographs and paintings, and excerpts from the letters and journals of persons famous and obscure.

The series' slow zooming and panning across still images was later termed the "Ken Burns effect".
Burns combined these images with modern cinematography, music, narration by David McCullough, anecdotes and insights from authors such as Shelby Foote, historians Barbara J. Fields, Ed Bearss, and Stephen B. Oates; and actors reading contemporary quotes from historical figures such as Abraham Lincoln, Robert E. Lee, Ulysses S. Grant, Walt Whitman, Stonewall Jackson, and Frederick Douglass, as well as diaries by Mary Boykin Chesnut, Samuel R. Watkins, Elisha Hunt Rhodes and George Templeton Strong and commentary from James W. Symington. A large cast of actors voiced correspondence, memoirs, news articles, and stood in for historical figures from the Civil War.

Burns also interviewed Daisy Turner, then a 104-year-old daughter of an ex-slave, whose poetry features prominently in the series. Turner died in February 1988, a full two-and-a-half years before the series aired.

Production ran five years. The film was co-produced by Ken's brother Ric Burns, written by Geoffrey C. Ward and Ric Burns with Ken Burns, and edited by Paul Barnes with cinematography by Buddy Squires. It was funded by General Motors, the National Endowment for the Humanities, the Corporation for Public Broadcasting, the Arthur Vining Davis Foundations, and the John D. & Catherine T. MacArthur Foundation.

Music
The theme song of the documentary is the instrumental "Ashokan Farewell", which is heard twenty-five times during the film. The song was composed by Jay Ungar in 1982 and he describes it as "the song coming out of 'a sense of loss and longing' after the annual Ashokan Music & Dance Camps ended." It is the only modern piece of music heard in the film, and subsequently became the first ever single release for the Elektra Nonesuch label, which released the series' soundtrack album. It became so closely associated with the series that people frequently and erroneously believe it was a Civil War song.

Ungar, his band Fiddle Fever and pianist Jacqueline Schwab performed this song and many of the other 19th-century songs used in the film. Schwab's arrangements in particular have been acclaimed by many critics. Musicologist Alexander Klein wrote: "Upon watching the full documentary, one is immediately struck by the lyricism of Schwab's playing and, more importantly, her exceptional arranging skills. What had been originally rousing and at times bellicose songs such as the southern "Bonnie Blue Flag" or the northern "Battle Cry of Freedom" now suddenly sounded like heart-warming, lyrical melodies due to Schwab's interpretations. The pianist not only changed the songs' original mood but also allowed herself some harmonic liberties so as to make these century-old marching tunes into piano lamentations that contemporary audiences could fully identify with".<ref name=klein>Alexander Klein, "Scoring Ken Burns' Civil War: An Interview with Pianist Jacqueline Schwab"Film Score Monthly, April 2013.</ref>

A major piece of vocal music in the series is a version of the old spiritual "We Are Climbing Jacob's Ladder", performed a cappella by the African-American singer, scholar and activist Bernice Johnson Reagon and several other female voices. The song appears on Reagon's album River of Life.Voices

Interviews
 Ed Bearss – Military historian and author
 Barbara J. Fields – Professor of American history at Columbia University
 Shelby Foote – American writer, journalist, and Civil War historian
 Stephen Oates – Professor of history at the University of Massachusetts Amherst
 William Safire – American author, columnist, journalist, and presidential speechwriter
 James W. Symington – former Congressman
 Daisy Turner – Daughter of a former plantation slave, oral historian
 Robert Penn Warren – American poet, novelist, and literary critic

Episode list
Each episode was divided into numerous chapters or vignettes, but each generally had a primary theme or focus (i.e., a specific battle or topic). The series followed a fairly consistent chronological order of history.

Reception and awards
The series received more than forty major film and television awards, including two Emmy Awards, two Grammy Awards, Producer of the Year Award from the Producers Guild of America, People's Choice Award, Peabody Award, duPont-Columbia Award, D.W. Griffith Award, and the US$50,000 Lincoln Prize, among dozens of others.

The series sparked a major renewal of interest in the Civil War. It was widely acclaimed for its skillful depiction and retelling of the Civil War events, and also for drawing huge numbers of viewers into a new awareness of the historical importance of the conflict. Before the series, the Civil War had receded in popular historical consciousness since its 1960s centennial. Following the series, there was a sharp upturn in popular books and other works about the Civil War.

Robert Brent Toplin in 1996 wrote Ken Burns's The Civil War: Historians Respond, which included essays from critical academic historians who felt their topics of interest were not covered in enough detail and responses from Ken Burns and others involved in the series' production.

The series has been criticized for perceived historical inaccuracies, since it focuses mostly on the battles of the Civil War to the detriment of other areas. Some also believe it provides a weak or faulty explanation of the causes of the war. While academic historians concur that the war was fought to preserve slavery, Burns presented Shelby Foote's framing of that dispute as a "failure to compromise". Though Foote was a journalist and novelist rather than a trained historian, he was given more screen time than any other commentator. The fact that Burns himself was not a historian, nor were most of his production team, has similarly led to accusations that his series did not contain a thorough enough historical overview of its subject. That most of them were also white men has also been fingered for a lack of coverage of women, blacks, or Reconstruction. The series has also been criticized for propagating the Lost Cause of the Confederacy ideology. Because Burns' documentary has been so influential, and serves as the main source of knowledge about the Civil War for many Americans, some critics fear it has perpetuated this discredited view.

Remastering

12th Anniversary
The entire series was digitally remastered for re-release on September 17, 2002 in VHS and DVD by PBS Home Video and Warner Home Video. The DVD release included a short documentary on how a Spirit DataCine was used to transfer and remaster the film. The remastering was limited to producing an improved fullscreen standard-definition digital video of the film's interpositive negatives, for broadcast and DVD. The soundtrack was also re-mastered and remixed in 5.1 Dolby Digital AC3 surround sound.

Paul Barnes, Editor & Post-Production Supervisor, Florentine Films at that time commented:

Ken Burns and I decided to remaster The Civil War for several reasons. First of all, when we completed the film in 1989, we were operating under a very tight schedule and budget. As the main editor on the film, I always wanted to go back and improve the overall quality of the film. The other reason for remastering the film at this time is that the technology to color correct, print and transfer a film to video for broadcast has vastly improved, especially in the realm of digital computer technology... We also were able to eliminate a great deal of the dust and dirt that often get embedded into 16mm film when it is printed.

25th Anniversary
For the 150th anniversary of the end of the war, and the 25th anniversary of the series, PBS remastered the series in high definition. This work involved creating a new 4K ultra-high-definition digital master of the film's original camera negatives and was carried out in association with the George Eastman House, where the original 16mm negatives are preserved. It aired on PBS from September 7 to 11, 2015. Blu-ray and DVD editions were released on October 13, 2015.

Soundtrack
A soundtrack featuring songs from the miniseries, many of which were songs popular during the Civil War, has been released.

See also
 The War,'' World War II documentary miniseries by Ken Burns
 The Vietnam War, Vietnam War documentary series by Ken Burns
 Still image film
 Lost Cause of the Confederacy

References

External links

 PBS: The Civil War
 
 Alexander Klein's interview with pianist Jacqueline Schwab
 americanarchive.org

Documentary films about the American Civil War
Television series about the American Civil War
PBS original programming
1990s American documentary television series
Films directed by Ken Burns
Documentary television series about war
Grammy Award for Best Spoken Word Album
Peabody Award-winning television programs
1990 American television series debuts
1990 American television series endings
Lost Cause of the Confederacy